NSA Suite A Cryptography is NSA cryptography which "contains classified algorithms that will not be released." "Suite A will be used for the protection of some categories of especially sensitive information (a small percentage of the overall national security-related information assurance market)."

Incomplete list of Suite A algorithms:
 ACCORDION
 BATON
 CDL 1
 CDL 2
 FFC
 FIREFLY
 JOSEKI
 KEESEE
 MAYFLY
 MEDLEY
 MERCATOR
 SAVILLE
 SHILLELAGH
 WALBURN
 WEASEL

See also
Commercial National Security Algorithm Suite
NSA Suite B Cryptography

References 

General
 NSA Suite B Cryptography / Cryptographic Interoperability

Cryptography standards
National Security Agency cryptography
Standards of the United States